Navahodads were a roots rock band which formed in 1995. They were led by singer-songwriter and guitarist, Brendan Kibble, who had previously fronted Bam Balams (1984 - 1992), and founding mainstay, Tim Denny, on drums. The Navahodads released two albums, Mumbo Gumbo (1995) and Madame Mojo's (1998). The band's sound was described as Texas R&B, swamp rock, soul, and rock.

Interest generated by their first album saw them tour Spain in 1996. For the tour they released a Spanish only single, "If It's Rockin' (Don't Bother Knockin')", on the Spanish label Louie Records.
The band split up in 2003 when Kibble moved to the United States. The band had recorded an album's worth of new material in 2003, which to date remains unreleased. A critic summarised, "Imagine Buddy Guy on a road trip, swinging by Tony Joe White's place, calling on Doug Sahm, and they all go to party in New Orleans...that's the vibe of the Navahodads."

Discography

Albums

 Mumbo Gumbo (1995), Pink Flamingo Records
 Madame Mojo's (1998), self-released

Single

 "If It's Rockin'" b/w "Funky She Devil" (1996), Pink Flamingo Records/Louie Records

Compilation tracks

 "Louie Louie", The First Louie Louie Spanish Compilation (1997), Louie Records
 "Hot Rod Hearse" and "Single Fin Theory", Surfarama (1997), Pink Flamingo Records
 "Kahanamokou Kick", Lost in the 60s - Surf Compilation (2003), Tronador

Band members
 Brendan Kibble: Vocals/Guitar - All releases
 Tim Denny: Drums - All releases 
 Karl "Dogbox" Bergersen: Bass - Mumbo Gumbo, Spanish Louie Louie Album
 Michael "Pineapples" Maunsell: Guitar - Mumbo Gumbo, Spanish Louie Louie Album
 George Bibicos: Keyboards - Madame Mojo's, Spanish Louie Louie Album, Surfarama
 Brad Fitzpatrick: Guitar - Madame Mojo's, Surfarama, Lost in the 60s
 Bill Kervin: Bass - Surfarama
 Mark "Buzz" Busby: Bass - Madame Mojo's, Lost in the 60s

References

Spencer, Chris (2002). Who's Who of Australian Rock. Five Mile Press.

Australian rock music groups